Aquila is an ornithological journal established by Ottó Herman, Budapest, Hungary, in .  It publishes peer reviewed articles and research notes focusing on birds, mostly − though not exclusively − on the avifauna of the Carpathian Basin.  Recent issues are bilingual, published in both English and in Hungarian.  Aquila is referred in Zoological Record, and in Fisheries and Wildlife Reviews.

See also
List of ornithology journals

References

External links

Journals and magazines relating to birding and ornithology
English-language journals
Publications established in 1894
Hungarian-language journals
Multilingual journals